1st Scots Guards F.C. were an English football team that existed from at least 1891. They played in the Southern League from 1895–96 and finished third of nine in Division Two. This made them eligible to play in a test match promotion decider against Clapton, which they lost 1–4. The following season they finished 8th of 13.

They also participated briefly in the London League Division One for the 1896–97 season before withdrawing, and were the last club to play Thames Ironworks  at their Hermit Road ground on 8 October 1896, when they lost 1–0.

They were still a functioning football team as late as 1909, when they won the Middlesex Senior Cup.

The Christmas truce football game of 1914 supposedly featured men from the 1st Scots Guards.

References

Scots Guards
Scots Guards
Scots Guards
Scots Guards
Scots Guards
Scots Guards
Scots Guards
Great Western Suburban League